The 2019 Arkansas Razorbacks baseball team represents the University of Arkansas in the 2019 NCAA Division I baseball season. The Razorbacks were coached by Dave Van Horn, in his 17th season with the Razorbacks, and played home games at Baum–Walker Stadium. Arkansas ended the 2018 season as runners-up in the College World Series (CWS). Five starting fielders and two starting pitchers from the 2018 team had moved on to professional baseball or graduation. Expectations were high for the 2019 team, picked to finished third in the SEC West and ranked between #12-25 in preseason polls.

Arkansas finished with a 46–18 (20–10 SEC) record, winning the SEC West and entering the postseason ranked #4-6 nationally. The Razorbacks swept the Fayetteville Regional and defeated Ole Miss in the Fayetteville Super Regional to clinch the school's tenth CWS, making back-to-back trips for the first time in school history. Arkansas lost two one-run games in Omaha.

Preseason
Arkansas scheduled two preseason exhibition games in Fall 2018 following a rule change by the NCAA. The first was scheduled against Oklahoma at L. Dale Mitchell Park on September 22, but was cancelled due to rain. The Razorbacks played Wichita State (coached by longtime Arkansas assistant coach Todd Butler) at home on October 5, playing 14 innings. The Razorbacks traveled to Little Rock to play the Little Rock Trojans for a second exhibition game. The exhibition match-up at Gary Hogan Field was the first for the Razorbacks against an in-state opponent in program history. The final week of fall practice was a best-of-five annual intrasquad Fall World Series.

In November, it was announced pitching coach Wes Johnson has been hired by the Minnesota Twins. Arkansas hired Matt Hobbs, who had coached the previous four seasons at Wake Forest. Head coach Dave Van Horn was inducted into the Arkansas Sports Hall of Fame in January 2019.

Preseason All-American teams

1st Team
Matt Cronin - Relief Pitcher (Baseball America) 
Heston Kjerstad - Outfielder (Perfect Game)
Heston Kjerstad - Outfielder (D1Baseball)
Heston Kjerstad - Outfielder (NCBWA)
Casey Martin - Shortstop (D1Baseball)
Casey Martin - Shortstop (NCBWA)
2nd Team
Casey Martin - Third Baseman (Perfect Game)
Matt Cronin - Relief Pitcher (Perfect Game)
Matt Cronin - Relief Pitcher (D1Baseball)
Dominic Fletcher - Outfielder (Baseball America)

3rd Team
Matt Cronin - Relief Pitcher (NCBWA)
Dominic Fletcher - Outfielder (Perfect Game)
Heston Kjerstad - Outfielder (Baseball America)
Casey Martin - Shortstop (Collegiate Baseball)

SEC media poll
The SEC media poll was released on February 7, 2019 with the Razorbacks predicted to finish in third place in the Western Division.

Preseason All-SEC teams

1st Team
Casey Martin - Shortstop
Heston Kjerstad - Outfielder
Dominic Fletcher - Outfielder
Matt Cronin - Relief Pitcher

Roster

Schedule and results

SEC Tournament

Fayetteville Regional

Fayetteville Super Regional

College World Series

Record vs. conference opponents

Rankings

2019 MLB draft

References

Arkansas
Arkansas Razorbacks baseball seasons
Arkansas Razorbacks baseball
Arkansas
College World Series seasons